Shaquille Agard (born December 7, 1993) is a Guyanese soccer player who plays as a forward for Canadian Soccer League club Serbian White Eagles FC.

College career
He began playing for the Centennial Colts.

In 2016, Agard began playing for the George Brown Huskies. In his first year, he scored nine goals to help them to a provincial bronze medal and also helped the Huskies win the OCAA indoor championship, being named indoor MVP as well as the George Brown Male Athlete of the Year. He was a three time Ontario Colleges Athletic Association all-star from 2016 to 2018.

Club career
In 2014, Agard played in League1 Ontario with Durham United FC.

In 2015, he began playing for the Guyanese club Fruta Conquerors FC in the GFF Elite League, where he scored five goals in seven games, before having to leave the club due to issues with his transfer.

In 2016, he returned to play for Durham, scoring three scores in 12 appearances.

In the 2018–19 season, he played indoor with the Mississauga MetroStars of the Major Arena Soccer League. Initially, he played indoor soccer in the Mississauga-based Arena Premier League with the Caribbean Stars AC.

In 2019, he played for Master's FA in League1 Ontario, scoring five goals in 11 games and was named a league Third Team All-Star. In 2021, he scored three goals in 9 league games, was named an East Division All-Star, and also appeared in a Canadian Championship match against professional side York United FC.

In March 2022, it was announced that he was joining the Serbian White Eagles of the Canadian Soccer League, however, he ultimately remained with Master's FA. He debuted for the Serbian White Eagles on June 18, 2022 in a 7–3 win over BGHC 1.

International career
In 2014, he made his debut for the Guyana national team at the 2014 Caribbean Cup qualification. He made five appearances between 2014 and 2017. He scored a goal on November 25, 2017, in a friendly against Indonesia.

References

External links

 George Brown College profile
 
 

1993 births
Living people
Association football forwards
Master's FA players
League1 Ontario players
Mississauga MetroStars players
Fruta Conquerors FC players
GFF Elite League players
Guyanese footballers
Guyana international footballers
George Brown College alumni
Centennial College alumni
Guyanese expatriate footballers
Guyanese expatriate sportspeople in Canada
Expatriate soccer players in Canada
Sportspeople from Georgetown, Guyana
Pickering FC players
Major Arena Soccer League players
Serbian White Eagles FC players
Canadian Soccer League (1998–present) players